Alexander Busby may refer to:

Alexander Busby (politician) (1808–1873), English-born Australian politician
Matt Busby (Sir Alexander Matthew Busby, 1909–1994), Scottish football player and manager